Events from the year 2013 in Indonesia

Incumbents

Events

 January 5 – 15: Cyclone Narelle 
 January 15 – February 23: 2013 Jakarta flood 
 February 20 :Vania Larissa has winner at Miss Indonesia and become Top 10 at Miss World to honour Indonesia country.
 March 23: Cebongan Prison raid
 April 13: Lion Air Flight 904 
 May 31: Multiply cease operations.
 July 2: 2013 Aceh earthquake
 September 28: Miss World 2013 held in Nusa Dua, Bali. 
 October 5–7: APEC Indonesia 2013 
 November: Shōnen Star's last issue is published.
 December 7: The Bali Package is signed
 December 9: 2013 Bintaro train crash

Television

Debuted
 Minute to Win It
 The Voice Indonesia
 Yuk Keep Smile

Ended

 Love in Paris

Sport

 2013 Indonesia national football team results 
 2013 Indonesia Super League 
 2013 Indonesian Premier League 
 2013 Liga Indonesia First Division
 2013 Liga Indonesia Second Division 
 2013 MNC Cup 
 2013 Indonesian Community Shield 
 2013 AFF U-19 Youth Championship
 2013 Islamic Solidarity Games
 2013 Indonesia Open Grand Prix Gold
 2013 SEABA Under-16 Championship
 2013 Indonesia Super Series Premier
 Indonesia at the 2013 Asian Indoor and Martial Arts Games
 Indonesia at the 2013 Asian Youth Games
 Indonesia at the 2013 Summer Universiade
 Indonesia at the 2013 World Aquatics Championships
 Indonesia at the 2013 World Championships in Athletics

 
Indonesia
2010s in Indonesia
Years of the 21st century in Indonesia
Indonesia